Susan Eng, LL.B. is a Toronto lawyer and former chair of the Metro Toronto Police Services Board from 1991 to 1995. She is also an activist in the Chinese community in Toronto.

History 
Eng, the daughter of immigrants from China, studied at Jarvis Collegiate Institute and received a Bachelor of Laws degree from Osgoode Hall Law School in 1975. She was called to Ontario Bar in 1977.

In 1984 Eng was a candidate in the Ward 6 by-election to fill John Sewell's vacated seat on Toronto City Council. She attracted support from the Progressive Conservative Party's Larry Grossman and Susan Fish and from Liberal Jim Coutts. Running as an independent, she was defeated by New Democratic Party candidate Dale Martin by a margin of 6,546 votes to 5,716. In the 1985 municipal election she supported Peter Maloney's unsuccessful candidacy in the same ward.

Eng was first appointed to the Metropolitan Toronto Police Services Board in 1989 by the Liberal government of David Peterson.

Eng's appointment to succeed June Rowlands as board chair was endorsed by the Toronto Star and Premier Bob Rae, as she supported Rae's police "reform" package, including mandatory reporting of each time an officer unholstered their gun. Eng's appointment was opposed by the Toronto Sun, many members of the police force, North York mayor Mel Lastman, and Scarborough mayor Joyce Trimmer.

Susan Eng served as board chair from 1991 to 1995. She had a tense relationship with Metro police chief William J. McCormack. Board deputy chair Norm Gardner complained that "she failed to let other board members know when she planned to leave town and where she could be reached in the event of an emergency requiring a quick response from the board". The police opposition to Premier Rae's mandatory reporting of weapon unholstering legislation culminated in a job action initiated by Police Association president Art Lymer on October 5, 1992, which spread to a "Blue Ribbon Campaign" by December of that year. McCormack tried unsuccessfully to convince Lymer to drop the campaign and when he was unsuccessful, Eng wanted McCormack fired. The rank-and-file strongly supported McCormack in this dispute, and a group of officers who had set up a vigil for one of their own killed on duty booed Eng when she showed up.

Susan Eng also had a public disagreement with her cousin, Metro police Sergeant Ben Eng, who was Metro Toronto's police officer of the year. Ben had gone against Metro Toronto Police policy and compiled statistics on the criminal activities of recent refugees from Vietnam and mainland China, finding that this relatively small group of people was involved in a disproportionately high number of crimes in Metro and reporting this to the Toronto Crime Inquiry. Susan said that such reporting was biased and racist and publicly criticized Ben. The intra-family feud included Susan skipping a banquet that honored Ben's contributions to the community, and being asked not to attend the funeral of Ben's grandmother.

According to an internal police report leaked in 2007, in 1991 during Eng's time as Police Board chair, then-detective Julian Fantino ordered a wiretap of Eng's friend Maloney. Conversations between Maloney and Eng were illegally recorded despite a court order that only the first minute of Maloney's conversations were to be monitored so as to determine whether the individual who he was talking to was on the list of those being investigated. Maloney had been instrumental in getting Eng appointed as police services board chair, and many in the police resented him for continually giving advice to Eng despite his lack of formal role.

Eng was vice-president of advocacy at the Canadian Association of Retired Persons, representing the organization on the board of directors for the Pharmaceutical Advertising Advisory Board. She departed the organization on January 27, 2016.

References

1952 births
Living people
Lawyers in Ontario
Canadian people of Chinese descent
York University alumni
Osgoode Hall Law School alumni
People from Toronto
Women in Ontario politics
Chairs of the Toronto Police Services Board
Canadian women lawyers